The Madera Tribune is a newspaper in Madera, California.

Edgar Eugene Vincent founded the Madera Mercury on March 21, 1885. Another paper, the Madera Tribune, was founded in 1892. The two papers merged to become the Madera Mercury-Tribune in 1920.

The Madera Mercury-Tribune was put into receivership in 1949. The assets were then purchased by Dean Lesher, who had purchased another paper called the Madera Daily News, founded in the 1940s. The combined paper was called the Madera News Tribune.

After Lesher's death, Lesher Newspapers, Inc. sold the paper to U.S. Media, which then sold it to Pacific Sierra Publishing. Pacific Sierra Publishing was about to shut down the paper in 2003, when it was sold to then editor Charles Doud, who formed the Madera Printing and Publishing Company, Inc. in 2004.

Editorial stance 

On the newspaper's website, the paper cites a quote by conservative activist and consultant Stephen Frank, saying "The Madera Tribune is one of the last true conservative newspapers in California."

References

External links 
 Official site
 Archive of Madera Mercury 1901-1925 editions
 Archive of Madera Tribune, 1916-1968 editions
 Archive of Madera Weekly Tribune 1918-1920 editions

Newspapers published in California
Madera, California
1885 establishments in California
Publications established in 1885